was a video game developer that was founded in Japan in 1987. They are best known for creating the Asuka 120% series.

History
In 1987, Fill-in-Cafe was founded as Team Cross Wonder, and later renamed itself as "Fill-in-Cafe" in 1989 and incorporated in 1991. They first developed Metal Sight for the Sharp X68000 under the Team Cross Wonder label, followed by developing Neural Gear under the Fill-in-Cafe label. Later, they hired several more companies like Intec and Family Soft to publish their products. In 1994, they became successful with the release of the Asuka 120% BURNING Fest. franchise, as well as with Mad Stalker: Full Metal Forth and its multiple versions.

In 1998, Fill-in-Cafe filed for bankruptcy. Some planned titles were canceled, such as a sequel to Panzer Bandit and an untitled, enhanced arcade port of the Asuka 120% BURNING Fest. Limited  with Kaneko being the arcade publisher. Shortly afterward, Success Corporation became in charge of developing Asuka 120% BURNING Fest. Final and Asuka 120% BURNING Fest. Return after their relationship with Fill-in-Cafe and Datam Polystar in developing and publishing titles together, such as Makeruna! Makendō 2: Kimero Youkai Souri for instance.

After bankruptcy, Family Soft bought the rights to most of its developed library, including their only 3 self-released titles: Community POM, Wakusei Koukitai Little Cats and Rose Crusaders (the latter was the first game of Noise Factory, a subsidiary company of Atlus and SNK).

Developed titles

3DO
Sotsugyou II: Neo Generation Special (JP Publisher: Shar Rock)
Tanjou: Debut Pure (JP Publisher: Shar Rock)

Arcade
Jan Jan Paradise (Electro Design)
Taisen Idol Mahjong Final Romance 2 (Video System)

Sharp X68000
Mission: Metal Sight (JP Publisher: System Sacom)
Neural Gear (JP Publisher: Crossmedia Soft)
Mad Stalker: Full Metal Forth (Family Soft)
Asuka 120% BURNING Fest (Family Soft)

FM Towns
Mad Stalker: Full Metal Force (Family Soft)
Asuka 120% Excellent BURNING Fest (Family Soft)

Sony PlayStation
Asuka 120% Excellent BURNING Fest (JP Publisher: Family Soft)
Asuka 120% Special BURNING Fest Special (JP Publisher: Family Soft)
Community POM (JP Publisher: Fill in Cafe)
Elfin Paradise (JP Publisher: ASK Kodansha)
Hatsukoi Valentine (JP Publisher: Family Soft)
Mad Stalker: Full Metal Force (JP Publisher: Family Soft)
Makeruna! Makendō 2: Kimero Youkai Souri (JP Publisher: Datam Polystar)
Metamor Panic: Doki Doki Youma Busters (JP Publisher: Family Soft)
Night Striker (JP Publisher: Ving)
PAL: Shinken Densetsu (JP Publisher: Tohoku Shinsha)
Panzer Bandit (JP Publisher: Banpresto)
Photo Genic (JP Publisher: Sunsoft)
Voice Paradise Excella (JP Publisher: ASK Kodansha)

Pc engine Scdrom2.
Asuka 120% Maxima: BURNING Fest (JP Publisher: Family Soft)
Championship Rally (JP Publisher: Intec)
Gain Ground SX (graphics cooperation) (JP Publisher: NEC Avenue)
Galaxy Deka Gayvan (JP Publisher: Intec)
Kakutou Haou Densetsu Algunos (JP Publisher: Intec)
Mad Stalker: Full Metal Force (co-developed by Kogado Studio) (JP Publisher: NEC Home Electronics)
Ruin: Kami no Isan (JP Publisher: Victor)

PC-98
Crasher Joe: Kanraku Wakusei no Inbou (JP Publisher: Family Soft)
Kidou Senshi Gundam MS Field 2 '92 (JP Publisher: Family Soft)
Kidou Senshi Gundam MS Field 2 '93 (JP Publisher: Family Soft)
Photo Genic (JP Publisher: Sunsoft)Yamashina Keisuke no Sengoku (JP Publisher: Takeru)

PC-FXMakeruna! Makendou Z (JP Publisher: NEC Home Electronics)Ojousama Sousamou (JP Publisher: NEC Home Electronics)Voice Paradise (JP Publisher: NEC Home Electronics)

Sega SaturnAsuka 120% Limited BURNING Fest (JP Publisher: ASK Kodansha)Night Striker S (JP Publisher: Ving)Asuka 120% LimitOver BURNING Fest (JP Publisher: Unofficial)

Super NESKiteretsu Daihyakka: Chōjikū Sugoroku (JP Publisher: Video System)

WindowsMetamor Panic: Doki Doki Youma Busters'' (JP Publisher: Family Soft)

References

External links
Official website (archived)
Fill-in-Cafe at MobyGames

 
Video game publishers
Video game companies established in 1987
Video game companies disestablished in 2000
Defunct video game companies of Japan
Video game development companies
1987 establishments in Japan
2000 disestablishments in Japan